Monte Cridola is a mountain of the Veneto, Italy. It has an elevation of 2581 metres. It is located on the border between the provinces of Belluno and Udine.

SOIUSA classification 

According to the SOIUSA (International Standardized Mountain Subdivision of the Alps) the mountain can be classified in the following way:
 main part = Eastern Alps
 major sector = Southern Limestone Alps
 section = Carnic and Gailtal Alps
 subsection = Carnic Prealps
 supergroup =Catena Duranno-Monfalconi-Pramaggiore
 group = Gruppo della Cridola
 code = II/C-33.III-A.1

References 

Mountains of Veneto
Mountains of Friuli-Venezia Giulia
Mountains of the Alps
Two-thousanders of Italy